Based on a True Story is the second solo studio album by American rapper Mack 10. It was released on September 16, 1997 through Priority Records. Production was handled by Ant Banks, Binky Mack, DJ Bobcat, Young Tre, Ice Cube, Soopafly, and Mack 10 himself. It features guest appearances from Ice Cube, Allfrumtha I, E-40, Snoop Dogg, The Comrads and Too $hort. The album debuted at number 14 on the Billboard 200, number 5 on the Top R&B/Hip-Hop Albums, and was certified Gold by the Recording Industry Association of America on October 21, 1997.

Along with singles, music videos were produced for two songs: "Backyard Boogie" and "Only in California" featuring Ice Cube and Snoop Dogg. Ice Cube makes a cameo appearance in "Backyard Boogie".

The song "Can't Stop" was previously released on Ant Banks' compilation album Big Thangs. "Dopeman", a cover version of the 1987 N.W.A song of the same name, was later included on two Priority Records compilations In tha Beginning...There Was Rap and Straight Outta Compton: N.W.A 10th Anniversary Tribute.

Track listing

Sample credits
Track 3 contains a sample from "Roxanne, Roxanne" written by Jeffrey Campbell, Shiller Shaun Fequiere, Fred Reeves, Curt Bedeau, Gerry Charles, Hugh Junior Clark, Brian "B-Fine" George, Paul Anthony George and Lucien George and performed by UTFO
Track 7 contains a sample from "Buffalo Gals" written by Trevor Horn, Malcolm McLaren and Anne Dudley and performed by Malcolm McLaren & The World's Famous Supreme Team
Track 10 contains an interpolation of "Hollywood Swinging" written by Robert "Kool" Bell, Ronald Bell, George M. Brown, Robert "Spike" Mickens, Claydes Charles Smith, Dennis R. Thomas and Rick A. Westfield and performed by Kool & the Gang

Personnel

Dedrick "Mack 10" Rolison – main artist, producer (tracks: 10, 13)
O'Shea "Ice Cube" Jackson – vocals (tracks: 1, 2, 4, 9, 13), producer (track 15)
Ryan "Binky Mack" Garner – vocals (track 3), producer (tracks: 3, 9, 12, 15)
Marcus "Squeak Ru" Moore – vocals (tracks: 3, 7)
Kelly "K-Mac" Garmon – vocals (track 3)
Terrell "Gangsta" Anderson – vocals (track 3)
Earl "E-40" Stevens – vocals (track 6)
Calvin "Snoop Dogg" Broadus – vocals (track 13)
Todd "Too $hort" Shaw – additional vocals (track 16)
James "Tre" Rabb – guitar (track 6)
Treyvon "Young Tre" Green – producer (track 2)
Bobby "Bobcat" Ervin – producer (tracks: 5, 10)
Anthony "Ant" Banks – producer (tracks: 6, 7, 11, 16)
Priest "Soopafly" Brooks – producer (track 13)
Carlos Warlick – engineering, mixing
Brian "Big Bass" Gardner – mastering
Art "Shō-G" Shoji – artwork
Michael Miller – photography
Marlene C. Durio – A&R
Marvin Watkins – A&R

Charts

Weekly charts

Year-end charts

Certifications

References

External links

1997 albums
Mack 10 albums
Priority Records albums
Albums produced by Soopafly
Albums produced by Ant Banks
G-funk albums